Milancy Khongstia (born 13 January 1993) is an Indian professional footballer who plays as a midfielder for Royal Wahingdoh F.C. in the I-League.

Career
Khongstia started his career with Royal Wahingdoh F.C. in the Shillong Premier League in 2012. He was named as the league's most promising player that season. He played in Royal Wahingdoh's promotion campaign in the 2014 I-League 2nd Division.

He made his professional debut for the side on 28 December 2014 in the Federation Cup against Mumbai.

Career statistics

References

Living people
Indian footballers
Royal Wahingdoh FC players
Association football midfielders
Footballers from Meghalaya
I-League 2nd Division players
I-League players
1993 births